Niamh Emerson (born 22 April 1999) is an English heptathlete from Shirland, Derbyshire.

In April 2018, Emerson competed in the heptathlon in the 2018 Commonwealth Games in Gold Coast, Australia, where she came third, winning the bronze medal for England, with a personal best of 6043 points.

In July 2018, Emerson won heptathlon gold for Great Britain at the 2018 IAAF World U20 Championships in Tampere, Finland, scoring a personal best of 6253 points.

Competition record

Heptathlon

2018 Commonwealth Games, Gold Coast, Australia 

3rd overall. 2018 Commonwealth Games Bronze Medalist

2018 IAAF World U20 Championships, Tampere, Finland 

1st overall. 2018 World U20 Gold medalist. 2018 U20 world lead.

Indoor Pentathlon

2019 European Athletics Indoor Championships, Glasgow, Scotland, Great Britain 

2nd overall. 2019 European silver medalist. U20 world record.

Personal bests

References

1999 births
Living people
British heptathletes
English heptathletes
British female athletes
English female athletes
Commonwealth Games medallists in athletics
Athletes (track and field) at the 2018 Commonwealth Games
Commonwealth Games bronze medallists for England
World Athletics U20 Championships winners
Medallists at the 2018 Commonwealth Games